"Simon Says" is a song by Iranian-Swedish singer-songwriter Laleh from her third studio album, Me and Simon which was released as the lead single of the album on 12 January 2009. The song peaked at No. 41 on the Swedish Singles Chart.

Music video
The music video was shot in Skellefteå, Sweden and directed by Martin Fodor-Nilsson who also directed the music videos for "Invisible (My Song)", "Storebror", and "Live Tomorrow".

Track listing
 "Simon Says" – 3:55

Charts

References

External links
 

Laleh (singer) songs
2009 singles
English-language Swedish songs
2009 songs
Warner Music Group singles
Songs written by Laleh (singer)